The list of ship launches in 1816 includes a chronological list of some ships launched in 1816.


References

Sources

1816
Ship launches